Quinten Huybers (born 6 December 2001) is a Dutch footballer who currently plays as a defender for Eindhoven.

Career statistics

Club

Notes

References

2001 births
Living people
Dutch footballers
Association football defenders
FC Eindhoven players
Eerste Divisie players